The Commissioner for the British Indian Ocean Territory is the head of government in the United Kingdom's overseas territory of the British Indian Ocean Territory. The Commissioner is appointed by the British monarch on the advice of the Foreign and Commonwealth Office. The Commissioner does not reside in the territory, as it has had no native population since the forced depopulation of the Chagossian people in the 1970s, and the only population is the military of the United States and the United Kingdom at the joint base at Diego Garcia.

The Commissioner's role is to administer the territory on behalf of the British government. This involves the passing of any necessary legislation for the territory, usually Orders in Council or Statutory Instruments. The Commissioner is also responsible for liaising with the military of the United States in matters concerning the territory. An Administrator of the British Indian Ocean Territory acts as the Commissioner's assistant. The Commissioner also appoints a representative on the territory, who is the senior British military officer at Diego Garcia.

The current Commissioner is Ben Merrick. Since 1998, the Commissioner of the BIOT has also served as Commissioner of the British Antarctic Territory.

Unlike the other governors and commissioners of other British overseas territories, there is no separate flag for the Commissioner of the British Indian Ocean Territory. This is mainly because he is never resident in the territory, and he would be unable to fly any flag from his offices in the Foreign and Commonwealth Office in London.

List of commissioners 

 1965–1967: The Earl of Oxford and Asquith
 1967–1969: Sir Hugh Selby Norman-Walker
 1969–1973: Sir Bruce Greatbatch
 1973–1976: Colin Hamilton Allan
 1976: Norman Aspin
 1976–1979: Philip Robert Aked Mansfield
 1979–1982: John Adam Robson
 1982–1985: William Nigel Wenban-Smith
 1985–1988: William Marsden
 1988–1991: Richard John Smale Edis
 1991–1994: Thomas George Harris
 1994–1996: David Ross MacLennan
 1996–1998: Bruce Harry Dinwiddy
 1998: Christopher Edward John Wilton
 1998–2001: Charles John Branford White
 2001–2004: Alan Edden Huckle
 2004–2006: Anthony Campbell Crombie
 2006–2008: Robert Leigh Turner
 2008–2012: Colin Roberts
 2012–2016: Dr Peter Richard Hayes
 2016–2017: John Kittmer
 2017–2021: Benjamin Robert Merrick
 2021–present: Paul Candler

References